Be Like Water (2008) is a play written by Dan Kwong, originally produced at East West Players, in association with Cedar Grove OnStage.  The play received its world premiere in Los Angeles on September 17, 2008, directed by Chris Tashima, at East West Players' David Henry Hwang Theater at the Union Center for the Arts in Los Angeles.  The story follows a young Asian American girl in 1970s Chicago, who is visited by the Ghost of Bruce Lee.

Play summary 
Tracy Fong is a 13-year-old ass-kicking, gung-fu fanatic tomboy, challenged by school bullies, airhead rivals, and a mother who just wants her to be a "normal girl." When bad goes to worse, the Ghost of Bruce Lee appears to teach her the true meaning of strength and the true power of water.

Characters 
 Tracy Fong 13, Chinese Japanese American. Tomboy-ish, tough, quick-tempered, defiant.
 Ghost of Bruce Lee 32, Tracy's mentor, Chinese American. The greatest martial artist in the world. Cocky, intense, philosophical yet funny.
 Kimiko Fong 38, Tracy's mother, Japanese American. Elegant, tightly-wound, upper-class roots, can go from cheery to icy in a flash.
 Frank Fong 35, Tracy's father, Chinese American. Easy going working-class guy, droll sense of humor, not easily angered.
 Bruce Lee 13, Tracy's best friend, Chinese American.  Scrawny, nerdy, acerbic wit, great disco-dancer. An unapologetic oddball.
 Jeremy Morton 14, School bully, Caucasian. Working-class, tough, angry.
 Tina Kawai MacDonald 13, Tracy's classmate, Hapa (Japanese Caucasian). Pretty, fashionable dresser, highly groomed, rather superficial.
 Two Hooded-Ninjas Companions of the Ghost in his Nether-world domain.

World Premiere company 
East West Players, Los Angeles, California; Opened September 17, 2009; Closed October 12, 2009

Original Los Angeles cast 
(in order of appearance)
 Ghost of Bruce Lee – Cesar Cipriano
 Tracy – Saya Tomioka
 Bruce Lee – Shawn Huang
 Jeremy – Jonathan Decker
 Frank – Michael Sun Lee
 Kimiko – Pam Hayashida
 Tina – Ariel Rivera
 Hooded Ninjas – Michael Sun Lee, Pam Hayashida, Ariel Rivera, Jonathan Decker

Los Angeles production staff 
 Director – Chris Tashima
 Martial Arts Choreographers – Diana Lee Inosanto & Ron Balicki
 Dance Choreographer – Blythe Matsui
 Set Designer – Akeime Mitterlehner
 Costume designer – Naomi Yoshida
 Lighting designer – Jose Lopez
 Sound Designer/Music Composition – Dave Iwataki
 Projection Designer – Alexander Gao
 Property Master – Ken Takemoto
 Hair, Makeup & Mask Design – Alyssa Ravenwood
 Stage Manager – Ondina V. Dominguez

Reviews 
 9/19/08 review by F. Kathleen Foley for Los Angeles Times
 9/19/08 review by Cristofer Gross on theatertimes.org
 10/03/08 review by Lynda Lin for Pacific Citizen
 10/17/08 review by William Hong on Asia Pacific Arts (UCLA Asia Institute)
 Oct. '08 review by Edward Pollard for Black Belt (magazine)

Awards 
 2009 Backstage Garland's Critics List (Jennie Webb):
 CHOREOGRAPHY – Ron Balicki, Diana Lee Inosanto, and Blythe Matsui
SOUND DESIGN – Dave Iwataki

See also

 Bruce Lee: A Warrior's Journey

References

External links 
 Playwright Dan Kwong's website

2008 plays
Fiction set in the 1970s
Asian-American plays
Cultural depictions of Bruce Lee
Martial arts mass media
Plays based on real people
Chicago in fiction
Plays set in Illinois
Chinese-American literature
Japanese-American literature